The Asian Poker Tour (APT) was founded in 2008. To date, the APT has staged more than 80 major events and numerous smaller tournaments mainly in the Asia-Pacific Region. The tour has stopped at Philippines, Macau, South Korea, Cambodia, Vietnam, India, Australia, London, New Caledonia and Cambodia.  APT events combined have generated over USD 30 Million in prize money all awarded to players.

History and Tournaments

2008 
The Asian Poker Tour (APT) was acquired by AsianLogic  (AIM:ALOG) in early 2008. APT held its first tournament in May 2008 in Manila, Philippines.

2009

2010 
In year 2010, the APT began its partnership with Resorts World Manila (RWM) which lasts until today.  APT held some of its biggest events in RWM including the Guinness World Records Longest Continuous Poker Tournament, the APT-RWM Iron Man Poker Challenge, held in 2013.

2011 

The APT began the year with its new event format dubbed the APT Asian Series. This event features the same type of tournaments the APT is known for but at a much lower buy in.

2012 
The APT introduced the APT Player of the Year (APT POY) loyalty program in year 2012 wherein players' performance is measured throughout a year. The APT POY receives $8,000 worth of APT and APT Asian Series Main Event buy-ins at an event of his/her choice among other perks, while 2nd and 3rd-place winners receive 1 APT Main Event seat (value up to $2,700) and 1 APT Asian Series Main Event seat (value up to $1,100) respectively. English poker pro Sam Razavi won the first APT POY title and bagged the award for the next three consecutive years.

2013 
In year 2013, the APT in partnership with Resorts World Manila made an attempt to break the Guinness World Records Longest Continuous Poker Tournament  which turned out to be a success. Shattering the previous record of 36 hours, 34 minutes and 41 seconds set in Delaware, USA. in August 2012, the APT-RWM Iron Man Poker Challenge set a new world record of 48 hours, 55 minutes and 58.5 seconds in December 2013.

2014 
2014 was a season when the tour went “quality over quantity”. APT Tournament Director Lloyd Fontillas called 2014 a building year for staging fewer events, with much more quality in getting great player numbers.

2015 
In 2015, the APT increased the APT POY prize from $8,000 to $10,000 worth of APT and APT Asian Series Main Event buy-ins. Sam Razavi earned the APT POY title for the fourth consecutive year bestowing him the title APT Quadruple Player of the Year.

The APT also opened its own poker room in Manila in February 2015 where two of the tour's events were held on that year, including the year-ender event.

2016 
2016 is APT's busiest year to date with 14 APT events and 1 APT-accredited event staged in a year.  In the beginning of the year, APT started offering the APT Main Event Bubble Protection which insured the players availing it by giving back the Main Event buy-in in the form of APT tournament credits when the insured player busts out on the bubble.  To avail of the bubble protection, players must pre-register for the Main Event, draw for a seat before starting time, and have his/her chips put into play on the first deal of level .

Changes in the winnings distribution of the APT Player of the Year (APT POY) has also been made. The second and third place awards have been eliminated and $2,000 worth of APT prizes were awarded to each APT POY leader from the Philippines, Japan, Korea, China, and one for the top nationality outside of those countries mentioned. The overall APT POY 2016 still received $10,000 worth of APT prizes. A total of $20,000 worth of APT prizes has been awarded for the APT POY 2016 race.

This was also the year when Sam Razavi was dethroned by Japan's Iori Yogo after four years of APT POY reign.

2017 
The APT Player of the Series (APT POS) has been introduced by the APT in its tournaments in 2017. It is a cumulative measure of player's performance throughout a full series. The APT POS awarded the 1st, 2nd and 3rd-place winners.

The last APT POY, Japan's Tetsuya Tsuchikawa, has been awarded as the season came to an end. The APT POY has been eliminated the following year to give way to more prizes for the APT Player of the Series.

2018 
Starting year 2018, the APT POY has been eliminated, and cash prizes have been added to the APT POS. On top of the prizes received by the APT POS, the winner is also awarded with $800 in cash, while the 2nd and 3rd-place winners received $100 in cash each as additional prizes.

APT Player of the Series 
The APT Player of the Series (APT POS) is the player loyalty program of APT to give award and recognition to its players who showed exemplary performance as measured throughout a full series.  The APT POS has been introduced in the year 2017, and cash prizes have been added in 2018.

The prizes received by the APT POS are:

1st place - Exclusive Luxury Watch, Customized Ring, Trophy, and $800 in cash

2nd and 3rd places - Trophy and $100 in cash

Formula for APT POS & APT POY = # of Points for Cashing based on Event Category + (Addend x 10)

Sample Computation:

Lloyd enters the Main Event that has a buy-in of US$1,000 (fee not included) and finishes 5th place earning him US$14,200.

Lloyd’s points toward APT POY and APT POS is 242

Formula: 100 points for cashing in a Category A event + 14.2 Addend (US$14,200 prize money / US$1,000 buy-in) x 10 = 242 Points

References

External links
 Official site

Poker tournaments